Cindai is the third album by the Malaysian pop singer Siti Nurhaliza released in 1997, and her second album that year. Cindai was the first attempt by Siti to sing traditional Malay folk songs. It was the most memorable album in the 1990s for its impact on the Malaysian music industry. The eponymous first track has been nominated for the best song in the 1990s. The album was Nurhaliza's first album to have a title track.

Recording
Cindai was Nurhaliza's first collaboration with Suhaimi Mohd Zain, fondly known as Pak Ngah, as the album producer and became her first full traditional album. It was produced after the success of her two self-titled albums.

Following the success of her first traditional Malay song, "Sri Mersing" in her album Siti Nurhaliza II, Nurhaliza recorded a fully traditional Malay album. Most of the songs were traditional compositions, with only two originals, namely "Cindai" and "Joget Berhibur". The other songs were produced with new arrangements.

Musical style
Nurhaliza is accompanied by an acoustic band for the traditional feel and adopted the zapin rhythm.

Release and reception
Cindai was released on 17 November 1997, eleven months after Siti Nurhaliza II. She later emphasized traditional Malay music on her later albums, Seri Balas (a duet album with Noraniza Idris; 1999), Sahmura (2000), Sanggar Mustika (2002) and Lentera Timur (2008).

To promote the album, three songs – "Cindai", "Joget Pahang" and "Joget Berhibur" - were released and later received music videos. She also performed the title song, "Cindai", as part of her special performance during the 1998 Commonwealth Games. Cindai was a commercial success and sold over 400,000 copies on its release and was certified 5× platinum. "Cindai" has also been translated into Mandarin sung by the Chinese singer Chien Bai Hui, though some of the lyrics remained untranslated, in which Chien claimed that she could not alter them due to their perceived beautiful and poetic composition.

On 1 April 2005, she sang Cindai as a part of a medley of Zapin songs along with Mahligai Permata and Ya Maulai at the end of Irama Malaysia segments of her solo concert at the Royal Albert Hall, London. Siti Nurhaliza also performs "Cindai" as part of the fourth medley (traditional) in her SATU concert in Istana Budaya in June 2009 and her Konsert Lentera Timur in October 2013 respectively, the song also performed by Siti at her recent concert, Dato' Siti Nurhaliza & Friends Concert in April 2016.

Critical response
Initial reception for the album was mixed. Some critics were calling the album as ""synthesizer-oriented" asli album". In a 3-star review by Zainal Alam Kadir of New Straits Times, he acknowledged that although Siti is a versatile singer, Cindai "does sound like a rushed job". He too criticized the presence of too much synthesized sounds.

Track listing

Credits and personnel 
Credits adapted from Cindai booklet liner notes.

 Ariffin – promotional unit
 S. Atan – producer, mixing, accordion, guitar, keyboard
 Bard – promotional unit
 Hairul Anuar Harun – songwriter
 Sham Amir Hussain – A & R manager
 Rizalman Ibrahim – apparel
 Hana Creative Image – image
 Rahim Jantan – producer
 Joe – promotional unit
 Joey – make-up
 Azizul Khamis – vocals
 Khairul Khamis – vocals
 Mazlina Khamis – vocals
 Weng Kong – photography

 Lau – engineer
 Tan Su Loke – executive producer
 Mohar – flute
 Mustafa Musa – rebana
 Nieta – promotional unit
 Andy Pok – mastering
 AS Design & Print – creation
 Syed Indera Syed Omar (Siso) – songwriter, vocals
 Rosnan – marwas, tabla
 Tina – promotional unit
 Vincent – engineer, mixing
 Wong – engineer, mixing
 Zainuddin Mohd Yunos – marwas, rebana, vocals
 Suhaimi Mohd Zain (Pak Ngah) – producer, mixing, accordion, guitar, keyboard, marwas, rebana, vocals

Awards 

 5 Platinum Album "Cindai"

References

External links
 Siti Nurhaliza- Official Website
 Siti Nurhaliza Collections

1997 albums
Siti Nurhaliza albums
Suria Records albums
Malay-language albums